The 1996 Champion Hurdle was a horse race held at Cheltenham Racecourse on Tuesday 12 March 1996. It was the 67th running of the Champion Hurdle.

The winner was Wally Sturt's Collier Bay, a six-year-old bay gelding trained in Wiltshire by Jim Old and ridden by Graham Bradley. Collier Bay's victory was a first in the race for jockey, trainer and owner.

Collier Bay, had been unsuccessful flat racer, who had become a good handicapper over hurdles before emerging as a potential champion by defeating Danoli in the Irish Champion Hurdle in January. Starting the 9/1 fourth choice in the betting, he won Champion Hurdle by two and a half lengths from Alderbrook the 1995 winner who started the 10/11 favourite. Fourteen of the sixteen runners completed the course.

Race details
 Sponsor: Smurfit
 Purse: £208,992; First prize: £127,966
 Going: Good to Soft
 Distance: 2 miles 110 yards
 Number of runners: 16
 Winner's time: 3m 59.00

Full result

 Abbreviations: nse = nose; nk = neck; hd = head; dist = distance; UR = unseated rider; PU = pulled up; LFT = left at start; SU = slipped up; BD = brought down

Winner's details
Further details of the winner, Collier Bay
 Sex: Gelding
 Foaled: 21 January 1990
 Country: United Kingdom
 Sire: Green Desert; Dam: Cockatoo Island (High Top)
 Owner: Wally Sturt
 Breeder: Stanley Estate and Stud

References

Champion Hurdle
 1996
Champion Hurdle
Champion Hurdle
1990s in Gloucestershire